Charlin Vargas is a male beach volleyball player from Dominican Republic, who participated  the 2006 NORCECA Men’s Beach Volleyball Continental Championship with Yewddys Pérez.

He also competed at the 2007 NORCECA Beach Volleyball Circuit with Roberto De La Rosa; and in 2008 with Yewddys Pérez and Roberto de Jesús.

At the Dominican Beach Tour 2008, he won a bronze medal, playing with Ezequiel Castillo.

He also earned a second place with Bahoruco at the Dominican Republic Volleyball League playing indoor volleyball.

Clubs
  Espaillat (2008)
  Bahoruco (2008)

References

 
 Federación Dominicana de Voleibol (FEDOVOLI)

Year of birth missing (living people)
Living people
Dominican Republic men's volleyball players
Dominican Republic beach volleyball players
Men's beach volleyball players